James Caffarey (16 May 1859 – 25 December 1913) was an English cricketer. He played three first-class matches for Surrey between 1881 and 1882.

See also
 List of Surrey County Cricket Club players

References

External links
 

1859 births
1913 deaths
Cricketers from Mitcham
English cricketers
Surrey cricketers